Manamadurai Bus Stand is a Major Bus Terminal located in NH49 RAMESHWARAM - COCHIN INTERSTATE CORRIDOR HIGHWAY.

It's a major turn over route of Madurai - Rameshwaram bus services.government and private buses from madurai MGR.MATTUTHAVANI are regularly tripping from Madurai to Rameshwaram. Every two minutes, A bus departs from MGR MATTUTHAVANI termini towards Manamadurai. This bus station is well connected with Auto stand, Taxi and Manamadurai railway junction is 500 meters from the Bus stand. Every 1 hour, 
direct buses are available to Coimbatore, Kodaikanal, Pallapatti, Tirupur, Erode, Salem, Theni, Tirupattur, Sivaganga, Tanjore, Tiruvallur, Trichy, Karaikudi, KalayarKoil, Thondi, Raja.Singa(R.S) Mangalam, Ilayankudi, Mudukalathur, Kamudhi which used to stop at MGR MATTUTHAVANI and Aarapalayam. The two busiest bus termini of Madurai city. 

Since it is located in the holy pilgrimage route to Rameshwaram., This bus station is always seems to be crowded. There are more buses via Manamadurai connecting

History
The bus terminal was built in 1999 to alleviate congestion from having too many buses at Periyar Bus Terminus. In May 2011, a bomb exploded in a trash can at the station.

Reception
There have been a few critiques related to the station. There have been complaints about a lack of availability of potable drinking water, few amenities, and insufficient bathroom facilities. The lack of drinking water is an issue directly outside the station as well, affecting a nearby vegetable market.

References

Bus stations in Tamil Nadu